Sardaran Rural District is a rural district (dehestan) in the Central District of Kabudarahang County, Hamadan Province, Iran. At the 2006 census, its population was 9,776, in 2,369 families. The rural district has 15 villages.

References 

Rural Districts of Hamadan Province
Kabudarahang County